County Donegal was a constituency represented in the Irish House of Commons until its abolition on 1 January 1801. The county received two seats at Westminster thereafter.

History
In the Patriot Parliament of 1689 summoned by James II, Donegal County was not represented. Between 1725 and 1793 Catholics and those married to Catholics could not vote.

Members of Parliament

Notes

References

Bibliography

Constituencies of the Parliament of Ireland (pre-1801)
Historic constituencies in County Donegal
1800 disestablishments in Ireland
Constituencies disestablished in 1800